John Segrave may refer to:
 John Segrave, 4th Baron Segrave,  English peer and landowner
 John Segrave, 2nd Baron Segrave, English commander in the First War of Scottish Independence